Eliassen is a Danish and Norwegian patronymic surname, literally meaning son of Elias. It may refer to:

Arnt Eliassen (1915-2000), Norwegian meteorologist
Grete Eliassen (born 1986), Norwegian freestyle skier
Petter Eliassen (born 1985), Norwegian cross-country skier
Sven G. Eliassen (born 1944), Norwegian historian

Danish-language surnames
Germanic-language surnames
Norwegian-language surnames
Patronymic surnames
Surnames from given names